Pinguipes chilensis, commonly known as the Chilean sandperch, is a species of ray-finned fish in the family Pinguipedidae. It is found in the southeastern Pacific Ocean off the coasts of Peru and Chile.

Description
The dorsal fin has six spines and twenty-eight soft rays, and the anal fin has a single spine and twenty-five soft rays. A specimen caught by Charles Darwin during the Beagle voyage was described as being more elongated than Pinguipes brasilianus, being about six and a half times as long as the body is deep and as having two longitudinal rows of ill-defined spots on the flanks and a larger, dark-coloured, round spot at the base of the caudal fin.

Distribution and habitat
P. chilensis is found in the southeastern Pacific Ocean. Its range extends from Tumbes in northern Peru, southwards to the Magallanes Region of southern Chile. It is also present in the kelp forest alongside other carnivorous fish such as the Peruvian morwong (Cheilodactylus variegatus), the sea chub (Graus nigra) and the Cape redfish (Sebastes capensis).

Ecology
P. chilensis is a generalist predator, its diet consisting mainly of crustaceans, with smaller quantities of fish and polycheate worms; less often eaten are molluscs, brittle stars, sea urchins, proboscis worms, peanut worms, spoon worms and tunicates. The diet also varies according to the time of year and the seasonal availability of prey species, with more fish being taken in the autumn. This fish is oviparous, with spawning taking place in the spring.

References

Pinguipedidae
Fish of Chile
Fish of Peru
Western South American coastal fauna
Fish described in 1833
Taxa named by Achille Valenciennes